Chapel Hill Mall was a shopping mall located at 2000 Brittain Road in Akron, Ohio, United States.  Built by Richard (R.B.) Buchholzer and Forest City Enterprises, it opened on October 12, 1967.  They continued to own the mall until 2004, when it was sold to the Chattanooga, Tennessee company CBL & Associates Properties, Inc., who owned it until 2014. At its peak the mall featured more than 100 stores, with Sears, J. C. Penney, and Macy's as anchor tenants.

History
Chapel Hill Mall sits on land once owned by Richard Buchholzer's father, J.J. Buchholzer.  During the Great Depression, J.J. Buchholzer became owner of a Hower's department store in downtown Akron.  The Buchholzers knew Akron would grow to the north, and they felt that a Hower's store should be located on their land.  It later became evident that even larger opportunities existed, and the natural choice was a climate-controlled shopping mall.  Buchholzer teamed up with Forest City Enterprises to build Akron's first indoor mall.  Plans were ready by 1963, but before the mall opened, Edward J. DeBartolo Corporation built Summit Mall on the west side of Akron. In the 1930s, young Richard Buchholzer found what appeared to be an old Indian council circle on his father's land.  Because of this, Buchholzer named the development "Chapel Hill".

Expansion plans to include a Higbee's store came up numerous times in the late 1980s and early 1990s.  A plan was considered in 1988 by part-owner Forest City Enterprises. It included a  addition for an additional department store.  Expansion was again mentioned in 1989.  A front-page story on the January 31, 1990 edition of the Akron Beacon Journal read "Higbee's Coming to Chapel Hill Mall".  The store, along with a food court and additional retail space, would be open by Fall 1991, it said.

In 1994, the mall's owners added the food court and retail expansion that exists today.  New flooring and ceiling tiles, a new fountain, and new lighting were also added.

In 2015, Sears Holdings spun off 235 of its properties, including the Sears at Chapel Hill Mall, into Seritage Growth Properties.

In 2016, Macy's permanently closed their Chapel Hill Mall store.

In 2017, Sears closed their Chapel Hill Mall store.

In January 2020, JCPenney announced they would close their Chapel Hill Mall store. The store closed in July 2020.

, the Chapel Hill Mall is permanently closed. The property is expected to become a business park. The carousel is planned to be moved to Lock 3 Park in downtown Akron.

Major tenants
Chapel Hill Mall featured no major anchor stores by the end of July 2020. JCPenney opened in 1966 before the mall proper. A second store, Macy's, operated in an anchor that was originally occupied by local chain O'Neil's until 1989, May Co. until 1993, and Kaufmann's from 1993 to 2006. Macy's closed in 2016. Sears was a third anchor of the mall which opened in 1967 at the same time as the mall and operated until 2017.  There used to be a multi-screen cinema at the mall as well. It opened in October 1966 as a two-screen theater, and eventually expanded to five screens. In 1987, General Cinemas (owner of the mall's cinema) opened an 8-screen multiplex just west of the mall, and in October 1996, Regal Cinemas opened their 10-screen theater immediately south of the mall. Less than two weeks later, the General Cinemas at the mall closed, and Old Navy took over the former theater until it closed in 2016. Woolworth also operated a store at the mall until 1997. It was later occupied by The Gap, Inc. which has since closed as well. On January 4, 2017, Sears Holdings announced that the Chapel Hill Sears store would be closing the following spring due to declining sales. On January 16, 2020, it was announced that JCPenney will close on April 24, 2020 as part of a plan to close six stores nationwide, leaving the mall with no anchors. However, on June 17, it was included in an updated list of 136 stores closing. Before closing Chapel Hill Mall was left with no operating tenants.

References

External links 
 Chapel Hill Mall's official site

Shopping malls in Ohio
Shopping malls established in 1967
Buildings and structures in Akron, Ohio
Defunct shopping malls in the United States
Tourist attractions in Akron, Ohio
Shopping malls disestablished in 2021